Factor VIII (FVIII) is an essential blood-clotting protein, also known as anti-hemophilic factor (AHF). In humans, factor VIII is encoded by the F8 gene. Defects in this gene result in hemophilia A, a recessive X-linked coagulation disorder. Factor VIII is produced in liver sinusoidal cells and endothelial cells outside the liver throughout the body. This protein circulates in the bloodstream in an inactive form, bound to another molecule called von Willebrand factor, until an injury that damages blood vessels occurs. In response to injury, coagulation factor VIII is activated and separates from von Willebrand factor. The active protein (sometimes written as coagulation factor VIIIa) interacts with another coagulation factor called factor IX. This interaction sets off a chain of additional chemical reactions that form a blood clot.

Factor VIII participates in blood coagulation; it is a cofactor for factor IXa, which, in the presence of Ca2+ and phospholipids, forms a complex that converts factor X to the activated form Xa. The factor VIII gene produces two alternatively spliced transcripts. Transcript variant 1 encodes a large glycoprotein, isoform a, which circulates in plasma and associates with von Willebrand factor in a noncovalent complex. This protein undergoes multiple cleavage events. Transcript variant 2 encodes a putative small protein, isoform b, which consists primarily of the phospholipid binding domain of factor VIIIc. This binding domain is essential for coagulant activity.

People with high levels of factor VIII are at increased risk for deep vein thrombosis and pulmonary embolism. Copper is a required cofactor for factor VIII and copper deficiency is known to increase the activity of factor VIII.

There is a formulation as a medication that is on the WHO Model List of Essential Medicines, the most important medications needed in a basic health system.

Genetics

Factor VIII was first characterized in 1984 by scientists at Genentech. The gene for factor VIII is located on the X chromosome (Xq28). The gene for factor VIII presents an interesting primary structure, as another gene (F8A1) is embedded in one of its introns.

Structure
Factor VIII protein consists of six domains: A1-A2-B-A3-C1-C2, and is homologous to factor V.

The A domains are homologous to the A domains of the copper-binding protein ceruloplasmin.  The C domains belong to the  phospholipid-binding discoidin domain family, and the C2 domain mediate membrane binding.

Activation of factor VIII to factor VIIIa is done by cleavage and release of the B domain. The protein is now divided to a heavy chain, consisting of the A1-A2 domains, and a light chain, consisting of the A3-C1-C2 domains. Both form non-covalently a complex in a calcium-dependent manner. This complex is the pro-coagulant factor VIIIa.

Physiology
FVIII is a glycoprotein procofactor.  Although the primary site of release in humans is ambiguous, it is synthesized and released into the bloodstream by the vascular, glomerular, and tubular endothelium, and the sinusoidal cells of the liver. Hemophilia A has been corrected by liver transplantation. Transplanting hepatocytes was ineffective, but liver endothelial cells were effective.

In the blood, it mainly circulates in a stable noncovalent complex with von Willebrand factor. Upon activation by thrombin (factor IIa), it dissociates from the complex to interact with factor IXa in the coagulation cascade. It is a cofactor to factor IXa in the activation of factor X, which, in turn, with its cofactor factor Va, activates more thrombin. Thrombin cleaves fibrinogen into fibrin which polymerizes and crosslinks (using factor XIII) into a blood clot.

The factor VIII protein has a half-life of 12 hours in the blood stream when stabilized by the von Willebrand factor. 

No longer protected by vWF, activated FVIII is proteolytically inactivated in the process (most prominently by activated protein C and factor IXa) and quickly cleared from the blood stream.

Factor VIII is not affected by liver disease. In fact, levels usually are elevated in such instances.

Medical use

FVIII concentrated from donated blood plasma, or alternatively recombinant FVIIa can be given to hemophiliacs to restore hemostasis.

Antibody formation to factor VIII can also be a major concern for patients receiving therapy against bleeding; the incidence of these inhibitors is dependent of various factors, including the factor VIII product itself.

Immunostain target
Factor VIII related antigen is used as a target for immunohistochemistry, where endothelial cells, megakaryocytes, platelets and mast cells normally stain positive.

Contamination scandal
In the 1980s, some pharmaceutical companies such as Baxter International and Bayer sparked controversy by continuing to sell contaminated factor VIII after new heat-treated versions were available. Under FDA pressure, unheated product was pulled from US markets, but was sold to Asian, Latin American, and some European countries. The product was tainted with HIV, a concern that had been discussed by Bayer and the U.S. Food and Drug Administration (FDA).

In the early 1990s, pharmaceutical companies began to produce recombinant synthesized factor products, which now prevent nearly all forms of disease transmission during replacement therapy.

History 
Factor VIII  was first discovered in 1937, but it was not until 1979 that its purification by Edward Tuddenham, Frances Rotblat and coworkers led to the molecular identification of the protein.

See also 
 Ralph Kekwick
 Frances Rotblat
 Edward Shanbrom
 Edward Tuddenham
 Ryan White

References

Further reading

External links 
  GeneReviews/NCBI/NIH/UW entry on Hemophilia A
 The Coagulation Factor VIII Protein
 
 

Acute-phase proteins
Recombinant proteins
Coagulation system
Wyeth brands
Pfizer brands
Cofactors